Coups d'état, coup attempts and coup plots since 2010 include:

Coups and Coup attempts since 2010

Africa

Asia

Europe

Oceania

South America

See also 
 Coup d'état
 List of coups and coup attempts by country
 List of revolutions and rebellions (chronological listing)

References

External links 
 Coups in the World, 1950-Present - Database on coups and coup attempts 1950–present, by Jonathan Powell and Clayton Thyne.
 Coups d'Etat, 1946-2013 - List of coups and coup attempts 1946-2013, by the Center for Systemic Peace.

History-related lists
Lists of military conflicts
2010s politics-related lists